Ludmila Andone (born 29 January 1989) is a Moldovan footballer who plays as a midfielder for FC Noroc Nimoreni and the Moldova women's national football team.

See also
List of Moldova women's international footballers

References

External links 
 

1989 births
Living people
Moldovan women's footballers
Women's association football midfielders
Moldova women's international footballers